Wendell Phillips Before the Concord Lyceum is an essay style letter-to-the-editor written by Henry David Thoreau and published in The Liberator in 1845 that praised the abolitionist lecturer Wendell Phillips.

On-line sources 
 
 Wendell Phillips Before the Concord Lyceum at The Picket Line

Printed sources 
 My Thoughts are Murder to the State by Henry David Thoreau
 The Higher Law: Thoreau on Civil Disobedience and Reform
 Collected Essays and Poems by Henry David Thoreau

Essays by Henry David Thoreau
1845 essays
Works originally published in American newspapers